Three Kinds of Heat is a 1987 American action film written and directed by Leslie Stevens and starring Robert Ginty, Victoria Barrett, Shakti Chen, Jeannie Brown, Leslie Clark and Malcolm Connell. It was released on December 4, 1987, by The Cannon Group, Inc.

Plot
Two tall policewomen are assigned by Interpol to U.S. Secret Agent Elliott Cromwell to help him to find the elusive 'Founder' of a vicious international crime syndicate. From London to New York the deadly underworld trail is strewn with false leads, dangerous deceptions and dramatic discoveries as the three police officers close in on the evil drug-dealing triad. Then romance develops and the sparks fly as the trio generates its own special kind of heat.

Cast       
Robert Ginty as Elliot Cromwell
Victoria Barrett as Terry O'Shea
Shakti Chen as Major Shan 
Jeannie Brown as Angelica
Leslie Clark as Duclos
Malcolm Connell as Jingmao
Edwin Craig as Scibillia
Patrick Durkin as Trainer
Keith Edwards as Kaufman
Barry Foster as Norris
Samantha Fox as Charleen
Paul Gee as Eddie Wing
Robert Grange as Peterson
Linda May Harris as Coco
Jerry Harte as Haig
Jack Hedley as Kirkland
Oscar James as Unle Joe
Bridget Khan as Adrianna
Arnold Lee as Cho
Reginald Marsh as Sir Hugh
Trevor Martin as Haggard
Sylvester McCoy as Harry Pimm
Michael Mellinger as Reggio
Paul Ridley as Collins
Mary Tamm as Piou
Natasha Williams as Fran

References

External links
 
 

1987 films
American action films
1987 action films
Films directed by Leslie Stevens
1980s English-language films
1980s American films